HD 4113 is a dual star system in the southern constellation of Sculptor. It is too faint to be viewed with the naked eye, having an apparent visual magnitude of 7.88. The distance to this star, as estimated by parallax measurements, is 137 light years. It is receding away from the Sun with a radial velocity of +5 km/s.

The primary member of this system, component A, is a Sun-like G-type main-sequence star with a stellar classification of G5V. Estimates of its age are five to seven billion years old, and it is spinning with a leisurely projected rotational velocity of 2.3 km/s. The star is metal rich, with nearly the same mass, radius, and luminosity as the Sun.

Orbiting this star is a giant planet and a brown dwarf (HD 4113 C); the latter has been directly imaged.

The most recent parameters for HD 4113 C as of 2022 come from a combination of data from radial velocity, astrometry, and imaging, showing that it is about 52 times the mass of Jupiter, and on an eccentric orbit with a semi-major axis of about 50.4 AU and an orbital period of about 348 years.

Planetary system
On 26 October 2007, Tamuz et al. used the radial velocity method to find a planet with a minimum mass one and half times that of Jupiter orbiting at 1.28 AU away from HD 4113 A. The planet's orbit is highly eccentric.

See also
 HD 156846
 List of extrasolar planets

References

External links
 

G-type main-sequence stars
M-type main-sequence stars
Binary stars
Planetary systems with one confirmed planet
Brown dwarfs

Sculptor (constellation)
Durchmusterung objects
004113
003391